Henry John Bear is a Native American politician from Maine. In January 2013, he was sworn in as the first elected member of the Maine House of Representatives representing the Maliseet people. He replaced David Slagger, who was appointed to the Maine House.

Bear grew up in Lewiston, Maine living in poverty. At 17, he joined the United States Coast Guard, where he met his wife, Violet Dotson. The two have four grown children and eight grandchildren. He and his family live in Houlton, Maine, where they operate a Maliseet respite care facility.

He was the Democratic candidate for the 144th district in the 2016 election.  In November 2017, he became a member of the Maine Green Independent Party. Bear ran unsuccessfully for Maine's 2nd congressional district in 2018. The Maliseet people opted not to send a delegate to the Maine House of Representatives for the 2019-2020 session.
Following completion of his LLM Degree, conferred by the University of Maine School of Law in May 2020, Henry Bear was admitted to the Bar in Maine that fall, owing to delays in processing caused by the Covid-19 Pandemic.  He has been engaged by a consortium of First Nations groups to sue the Catholic Church for conditions members experienced in residential schools in Canada.

References

21st-century American politicians
Living people
Maine Democrats
Maine Greens
Maine Independents
Maliseet people
Members of the Maine House of Representatives
Native American people from Maine
Native American state legislators in Maine
Green Party of the United States officeholders
People from Houlton, Maine
Politicians from Lewiston, Maine
University of Maine at Presque Isle alumni
University of New Brunswick alumni
1956 births